The members of the Wentworth family of both the U.S. and Australia, as listed below, are descended from Thomas Wentworth and Jane, the daughter of Sir Oliver Mirfield. Sir Oliver died about 1522. The American Wentworths of New Hampshire are descended from Thomas' son Oliver. The Wentworth branch of Virginia and Maryland, and the Australian Wentworths, are descended from another son Roger. The Wentworth family, along with the Arden family, the Berkeley family and the Swinton family, is descended in the male line from pre-Norman Conquest Anglo-Saxon roots.

United States
The Wentworth family was a prominent American political family, mostly based in the British colonies and later U.S. states of New Hampshire, Maryland, and the Commonwealth of Virginia.  Prominent members of the family include:

William Wentworth (1616-1697), patriarch of the New Hampshire branch of the family, and one of the early settlers of New Hampshire
Thomas Wentworth, Gentleman (1625-1672), Born into a cadet branch of the ancient Wentworth family, emigrated to Maryland and patented Wentworth-Woodhouse Plantation, named after the Wentworth family seat Wentworth-Woodhouse in Yorkshire.
John Wentworth (1671-1731), grandson of William Wentworth, and Lieutenant Governor of the Province of New Hampshire. As the Governor of New Hampshire at the time was simultaneously Governor of the Province of Massachusetts, the Lieutenant Governors of New Hampshire served with considerable power over the colony.
Benning Wentworth (1696-1770), first independent colonial Governor of New Hampshire who was not also Governor of Massachusetts
John Wentworth (1719-1781), a grandson of Lieutenant Governor John Wentworth, and cousin to the colonial governor of the same name, the 1st Baronet Wentworth. He was a judge, a colonel in the colonial militia, and sided with the revolutionary cause against his cousin.
Sir John Wentworth, 1st Baronet (1737-1820), a grandson of Lieutenant Governor John Wentworth through his son Mark, nephew of Benning Wentworth, and loyalist colonial Governor of New Hampshire during the American Revolution.
John Wentworth Jr. (1745-1787), son of Judge John Wentworth, and New Hampshire representative to the Continental Congress. Like his father, he was a revolutionary sympathizer and member of the New Hampshire Committee of Safety.
Sarah Wentworth Apthorp Morton (1759-1846), poet
Stephen G. Wentworth (1811–1897), descendant of William Wentworth and founder of the Wentworth Military Academy and College in Missouri.
Erastus Wentworth (1813-1816), a Christian missionary to China
John Wentworth (1815-1888), born in New Hampshire, but migrated to Chicago where he was elected to the U.S. House of Representatives from Illinois and also Mayor of Chicago
Moses J. Wentworth, nephew of Mayor John Wentworth of Chicago, and his protégé. He would himself serve in the Illinois House of Representatives

Australia
D'Arcy Wentworth (1762-1827) was born in Portadown, County Armagh, Ireland and emigrated to Australia in 1790 as an assistant surgeon to the then new colony of New South Wales. D'Arcy Wentworth was a descendant of another D'Arcy Wentworth, born in 1640, who had gone to Ireland. That second D'Arcy was in turn a descendant of William Wentworth of Wentworth Woodhouse in the thirteenth century. He came from Mattersey Hall, North Elmsall, Yorkshire, and was a member  of a collateral branch of the family of Thomas Wentworth, 1st Earl of Strafford, also of Wentworth Woodhouse.
William Charles Wentworth (1790-1872) was an Australian explorer, journalist, politician and author, and one of the leading figures of early colonial New South Wales. He was the first native-born Australian to achieve a reputation overseas, and a leading advocate for self-government for the Australian colonies, son of D'Arcy Wentworth.
D'Arcy Wentworth Jr. (1793-1861), son of D'Arcy Wentworth, was from 1843 to 1845 a member of the New South Wales Legislative Council.
"Bill" Wentworth AO (1907-2003), Australian politician, was a Liberal and later Independent member of the Australian House of Representatives from 1949 to 1977, with a reputation as a fierce anti-Communist. He was the great grandson of William Charles Wentworth (1790-1872).

References

Internal and external links
 Wentworth (surname)
 Wentworth (disambiguation)
 Wentworth World Wide: Facebook group
 Extinct and Dormant Baronetcies by John Burke and John Bernard Burke: London Scott Webster and Geary 1838: Wentworth, of North Elmsal, p.559
WENTWORTH3 Tudor Court: Tudor England Peerage: Elizabethan Peerage: Wentworth of Nettlestead: Thomas Wentworth. (This website may not be strictly authorative, but it is consistent with the references, and by using the links, you can go backward or forward in time.)

 
Political families of the United States
Political families of Australia